2-Fluorodeschloroketamine (also known as 2'-Fl-2-Oxo-PCM, Fluoroketamine and 2-FDCK) is a dissociative anesthetic  related to ketamine. Its sale and use as a designer drug has been reported in various countries. It is an analogue of ketamine where the chlorine group has been replaced by fluorine. Due to its recent emergence, the pharmacological specifics of the compound are mostly unclear, but effects are reported to be similar to it's parent compound, ketamine.

History 
The synthesis of 2-FDCK was first described in a 2013 paper as part of a larger effort to synthesize and evaluate new anesthetic drugs based on ketamine and its analogues. Ketamine itself was first introduced in 1964 and was approved for clinical use in 1970. Since then it has become one of the most important and applicable general anesthetics as well as a popular recreational drug.

The use of 2-FDCK as a research chemical has been reported in various countries. Many of these new psychoactive substances (NPS) appear on the drug market in order to circumvent existing drug policies. 2-FDCK was first formally notified by the EMCDDA in 2016, alongside 65 other new substances. Due to its recent appearance, little research has been done on the compound so far.

Chemistry

Structure 
The full chemical name of 2-FDCK is 2-(2-fluorophenyl)-2-(methylamino)cyclohexan-1-one.

2-FDCK belongs to a class of compounds called arylcyclohexylamines which contains various other drugs such as PCP and ketamine. Their general structure consists of a cyclohexylamine unit with an aryl group attached to the same carbon as the amine. 2-FDCK has an o-fluorophenyl group as an aryl substituent and the amine group is methylated. The cyclohexyl ring features a ketone group next to the amine position.

The chemical structure of 2-FDCK differs from ketamine only in that there is a fluorine atom attached to the phenyl group. Ketamine has a chlorine atom in that position.

Synthesis 
2-FDCK can be synthesized in a five-step reaction process. First 2-fluorobenzonitrile reacts with the Grignard reagent cyclopentyl magnesium bromide followed by a bromination reaction to obtain α-bromocyclopentyl-(2-fluorophenyl)-ketone. The reaction of the obtained ketone with methylamine at -40 °C then results in the formation of α-hydroxycyclopentyl-(2-fluorophenyl)-N-methylamine. Finally, the five-membered ring cyclopentanol form is expanded to a cyclohexylketone form by a thermal rearrangement reaction. HCl is used to create a water-soluble HCl salt of 2-FDCK.

Detection 
2-FDCK and its metabolites can be detected in urine with the use of liquid chromatography mass spectrometry (LC/MS).

Pharmacology

Metabolism 

The metabolism of 2-FDCK is analogous to that of ketamine: the enzymes CYP2B6 and CYP3A4, the latter to a lesser extent, metabolise 2-FDCK to Nor-2FDCK via N-demethylation. This is further metabolised either to dehydronor-2FDCK by CYP2B6 or to hydroxynor-2FDCK by CYP2A6 and CYP2B6.

In general, the 2-FDCK equivalent shows stronger docking to CYP2B6 in simulations, as well as slower metabolism rate, than the more well-known ketamine. The lipophilicity is observed to be lower for 2-FDCK than for ketamine. In vitro to in vivo extrapolation predicts that in the body, 2-FDCK shows a lower intrinsic hepatic clearance than ketamine. Both of these characteristics would suggest that the effects of 2-FDCK last longer than those of ketamine.

Pharmacodynamics 
2-FDCK is structurally similar to ketamine, so a similar mechanism of action is expected, but there has been no study done to confirm this. Due to the halogen in the 2 position not being a chlorine but a fluorine, the molecule is less polar. This could influence binding to proteins, such as the NMDA receptor that ketamine primarily binds to and acts as an antagonist towards.

Comparison to other halogen-substituted ketamine variants 
For general (halogen) substitutions of ketamine, docking strength for CYP2B6 follows the pattern H < Br < Cl < F. The parameter of internal clearance follows the pattern Br > Cl > F > H. Lastly, Km (Michaelis constant) follows the pattern of Br < Cl < F < H, and as such the in-vitro metabolism rate follows the inverse pattern, namely Br > Cl > F > H.

Effects

Dosage 
2-FDCK is very new and not yet sufficiently studied. Therefore, information on dosage can only be obtained from purely anecdotal sources.

Possible effects and dangers 
In 2019, 2-FDCK was found in poisoned individuals in Hong Kong in combination with other ketamine-type drugs. 2-FDCK was not assumed to be an impurity because it was present in high levels while ketamine was present at trace levels. The actual drug specimens were not available, so it was not possible to verify this. Clinical effects were observed but because the drug was taken in combination with other ones, it was not possible to determine what effects were caused by which drug. The clinically observed effects of the patients were: impaired consciousness, agitation, abnormal behaviour, hypertension and tachycardia. Most patients were discharged from the hospital after a few days of supportive treatment.

Legal status
Due to the fast emergence of NPS, new substances such as 2-FDCK are often not yet specifically mentioned in controlled substance legislation. As a result, NPS are sometimes marketed as 'legal highs'. 2-FDCK is currently illegal in Italy Japan, Latvia, Singapore, Sweden, Switzerland, as well as being covered by blanket bans in Canada, Belgium, and the UK.

See also 
 3-Fluorodeschloroketamine
 Bromoketamine
 Deschloroketamine
 Fluorexetamine
 Methoxyketamine
 Trifluoromethyldeschloroketamine

References 



Arylcyclohexylamines
Designer drugs
Dissociative drugs
Fluoroarenes
Ketones
NMDA receptor antagonists